Two submarines of the Royal Navy have been named HMS Artful:

 , an  launched in 1947.
 , an  launched in 2014.

Royal Navy ship names